JAMA Surgery is an international peer-reviewed journal, which began publication in 1920. It is the official publication of the Association of VA Surgeons, the Pacific Coast Surgical Association, and the Surgical Outcomes Club. It is a member of the JAMA Network, a consortium of peer-reviewed, general medicine and specialty publications. Its current (2022) editor-in-chief is Melina Kibbe at the University of North Carolina at Chapel Hill.

Published online weekly, every Wednesday, JAMA Surgery is also published in print/online issues 12 times a year. In 2021, the journal logged over 3.8 million web sessions and more than 4.7 million article views and downloads. Without any author fees, all research articles are made free access online 12 months after publication on the website. In addition, the online version is freely available or nearly so to institutions in developing countries through the World Health Organization's HINARI program.

Mission statement
"To promote the art and science of surgery by publishing relevant peer-reviewed research to assist the surgeon in optimizing patient care. JAMA Surgery will also serve as a forum for the discussion of issues pertinent to surgery, such as the education and training of the surgical workforce, quality improvement, and the ethics and economics of health care delivery."

Brief history
In July 1920, the first issue of Archives of Surgery was published by the American Medical Association. William J. Mayo, MD, who was a member of the editorial board and authored the inaugural editorial, indicated that Archives of Surgery would follow the character and scope of its sister journals, Archives of Internal Medicine, Archives of Neurology and Psychiatry, and the American Journal of Diseases of Children. Mayo also commented that Archives of Surgery would not compete with the other two prominent surgical journals that existed at the time: Annals of Surgery, established in 1885, and Surgery, Gynecology and Obstetrics, established in 1905. The trustees who founded Archives of Surgery believed that creating this new surgical journal would help alleviate the publication burden of the other two surgical journals while also creating a "sphere of its own" that would be "sufficiently useful to the profession to warrant its entering the field". 

One of the most notable changes for Archives of Surgery occurred in January 2013 when the name was changed to JAMA Surgery. This name change occurred across the entire JAMA Network.

Editors-in-chief, 1920 to present

Dean Lewis, MD; 19201940
Waltman Walters, MD; 19411942, 19461961
Lester Dragstedt, MD; 19431945
J. Garrett Allen, MD; 19621969
Richard Warren, MD; 19701976
Arthur Baue, MD; 19771988
Claude H. Organ Jr, MD; 19892004
Julie Ann Freischlag, MD; 20052014
Melina Kibbe, MD; 2015present

Editorial information
The acceptance rate for JAMA Surgery is 14% with a median time to first decision in 10 days and 38 days with review. All articles are published online first. Additional information on the types of articles published and editorial policies is available in the journal's "Instructions for Authors". 

JAMA Surgery is abstracted and indexed in Index Medicus/MEDLINE/PubMed. It is also included on the University Grants Commission of India list of approved journals.

World ranking

According to the annual Journal Citation Reports, the 2021 impact factor for JAMA Surgery is 16.681, making it the highest-ranking surgery journal in the world. This continues a precedent that the journal set in 2018 as the first surgery publication to break double digits in that scientometric index.

See also
List of American Medical Association journals

References and notes

External links

Surgery journals
American Medical Association academic journals
Academic publishing
Publications established in 1920
Monthly journals
English-language journals